The Rice Thomason Barn is a historic farm building located near Jerome, Idaho. It was listed on the National Register of Historic Places on September 8, 1983, as part of a group of structures built from lava rock in south central Idaho.

It has a hay hood.

See also
 Historic preservation
 History of agriculture in the United States
 National Register of Historic Places listings in Jerome County, Idaho

References

External links 
 * 

1930 establishments in Idaho
Barns on the National Register of Historic Places in Idaho
Buildings and structures completed in 1930
Buildings and structures in Jerome County, Idaho
Lava rock buildings and structures
Barns with hay hoods
National Register of Historic Places in Jerome County, Idaho